Yosef "Yossi" Meir Cohen (born 10 September 1961) was the Director of Mossad, the national intelligence agency of Israel.

Early life
Cohen was born in Jerusalem to a religious family and grew up in the Katamon neighborhood. His father Aryeh was an eighth-generation Sabra who was descended from one of the founding families of the Mea Shearim neighborhood of Jerusalem. He worked in a senior position at Bank Mizrahi and was also an Irgun veteran. His mother Mina was a teacher and school principal. She was a seventh-generation Sabra, born to a Jewish family rooted in Hebron, now part of the West Bank.

Cohen was raised in a religious household and was a member of the Bnei Akiva religious Zionist youth movement. He attended the religious high school Yeshivat Or Etzion.

Career

Cohen was drafted into the Israel Defense Forces in 1979. He volunteered as a paratrooper in the 35th Paratroopers Brigade. He served as a soldier and a squad leader. After being discharged, he studied at university in London, and joined the Mossad in 1982. Cohen has been described as 'able to inspire the confidence of his charges'. He became a case officer, charged with recruiting and handling spies in foreign nations. While in training, he had been the only religious candidate in the Mossad's case officer course at the time. He ran agents in a number of countries over his career, and rose to lead the Mossad's collections division ("Tsomet"). From 2011 to 2013, he was the deputy director of the Mossad, serving under Tamir Pardo. He was known publicly as "Y" (Hebrew: "י") in this post. Cohen won the prestigious Israel Security Prize for his Mossad work.

In August 2013 he was appointed the National Security Advisor to the Prime Minister of Israel. In December 2015, Cohen was appointed to succeed Tamir Pardo as director of Mossad. and assumed office in January 2016. Cohen is one of the closest officials to Netanyahu.

In January 2018, Cohen oversaw the Mossad operation to steal Iran's secret nuclear archive in Tehran and smuggle it out of the country. According to the Jerusalem Post, a map of nuclear sites captured in the operation has not yet been made public. Among the assassinations attributed to the Mossad during Cohen's tenure were those of Hamas drone expert Mohamed Zouari in Tunisia, Hamas rocket expert Fadi Mohammad al-Batsh in Malaysia, and Iranian nuclear program chief Mohsen Fakhrizadeh in Iran.

Cohen has also been the chief Israeli official in charge of managing Israel's largely clandestine relations with various Arab nations. He has often met with representatives of Egypt, Jordan, the United Arab Emirates, Saudi Arabia, and Qatar and helped negotiate Netanyahu's visit to Oman in 2018. Reportedly, he met Sudan's chief of intelligence, though the Sudanese intelligence service denied it. He was Israel's chief negotiator in arranging the Israel–United Arab Emirates peace agreement.

Intelligence reporter Ronen Bergman has written that Cohen has a reputation as a tough boss, that he speaks fluent English, French, and Arabic, and is also a marathon runner. Cohen is nicknamed "the Model" for his stylish appearance.

Israeli Prime Minister Benjamin Netanyahu reportedly considered Cohen to be the best person to succeed him as prime minister when he leaves office. In September 2019, The Jerusalem Post listed Cohen as the most influential Jew of the year.

In June 2021, Cohen retired from Israel’s national intelligence agency

Political views
At a conference in 2019 in Herzliya, Israel, Cohen announced that Israel has a unique window of opportunity to reach a comprehensive peace agreement with the Palestinians. He stated that this is also the view of the Mossad unit whose job it is to analyze diplomatic opportunities. Given the present good relations with the United States, the Russian government, and restoration of partial diplomatic ties with the Arab states of the Persian Gulf centered around opposition to Iran, in Cohen's view there is a one-time opportunity for Middle East peace under terms very beneficial to Israel that the Israeli government must now seize.

The Jerusalem Post reported in September 2019 that Cohen "does not believe anything will move on the peace process until Palestinian Authority President Mahmoud Abbas leaves office."

Family 
Cohen and his wife Aya have four children. One of his sons, Yonatan, is a former officer in Unit 8200 and has cerebral palsy. He also has one granddaughter. Cohen lives in Modi'in-Maccabim-Re'ut and is a Masorti Jew.

References

External links

 Yossi Melman, WHAT'S NEXT FOR THE CHARMING HEAD OF THE MOSSAD?, The Jerusalem Post, September 7, 2018

1961 births
Living people
Directors of the Mossad
Israel Defense Prize recipients
Israeli Jews
People from Jerusalem